Režanci is a village in Croatia.

Notable people from Režanci
 Ivan Milovan (born 1940), Roman Catholic prelate

References

Populated places in Istria County